Medowie Football Club is an Australian football club based in Medowie, a suburb of the Port Stephens Council local government area in the Hunter Region of New South Wales, Australia. The club currently competes in the Zone League Three.

History
Medowie FC was founded in 1979 as Medowie Soccer Club.

Medowie has experienced a major growth over their nearly 40-year history with the club now home to over 500 players.

Current squad

External links
 

Soccer clubs in New South Wales
Association football clubs established in 1979
1979 establishments in Australia